Grace Pearl Ingalls Dow (May 23, 1877 in Burr Oak, Iowa – November 10, 1941 in Manchester, South Dakota) was the fifth and last child of Caroline and Charles Ingalls. She was the youngest sister of Laura Ingalls Wilder, known for her Little House on the Prairie books.

Biography
Following public school, Grace Ingalls studied to become a schoolteacher.  After completing her training, she taught in the nearby town of Manchester, South Dakota, seven miles west of De Smet, South Dakota, where her family had settled.  On October 16, 1901, she married Nathan William Dow in the parlor of her parents' home in De Smet.
Besides being a farm wife, Dow dabbled in journalism like her older sister Carrie, acting as a stringer for several local newspapers later in her life. After her parents' deaths, she and Carrie took care of their eldest sister Mary, who was blind.

Dow died of complications from diabetes in Manchester, South Dakota on November 10, 1941 at age 64. Diabetes ran in the Ingalls family and Laura, Carrie, and Grace all died from the complications of the disease, Dow being the first Ingalls sibling to succumb. She is buried near the Ingalls family plot at De Smet Cemetery in De Smet, South Dakota; her husband is buried next to her.  The couple had no children.

In the media
Dow was portrayed in the television adaptations of Little House on the Prairie by:
 Uncredited children at first and then twins Wendi and Brenda Turnbaugh in the television series Little House on the Prairie
 Courtnie Bull and Lyndee Probst in Beyond the Prairie: The True Story of Laura Ingalls Wilder.

References

External links

About the Ingalls Family (Sarah S. Uthoff)

1877 births
1941 deaths
American people of English descent
Deaths from diabetes
People from Kingsbury County, South Dakota
Ingalls family
Delano family
Cowgirl Hall of Fame inductees
People from De Smet, South Dakota

da:Laura Ingalls Wilder#Lillesøsteren Grace Pearl Ingalls Dow